The 1994 Ball State Cardinals football team was an American football team that represented Ball State University in the Mid-American Conference (MAC) during the 1994 NCAA Division I-A football season. In its 10th and final season under head coach Paul Schudel, the team compiled a 5–5–1 record (5–3–1 against conference opponents) and finished in fifth place out of ten teams in the MAC. The team played its home games at Ball State Stadium in Muncie, Indiana.

The team's statistical leaders included Brent Baldwin with 1,342 passing yards, Tony Nibbs with 1,210 rushing yards, Juan Gorman with 662 receiving yards, and Michael Blair each with 78 points scored.

Schedule

References

Ball State
Ball State Cardinals football seasons
Ball State Cardinals football